is a railway station on the Nippō Main Line operated by JR Kyūshū in Usa, Ōita, Japan.

Lines

Layout 
The station, which is unstaffed, consists of an island platform serving two tracks. The station building is an old wooden structure of Japanese design and serves only to house a waiting area and an automatic ticket vending machine. Access to the island platform is by means of a footbridge.

Adjacent stations

History
Japanese Government Railways (JGR) opened the station on 22 April 1911 as an additional station on its then Hōshū Main Line. On 15 December 1923, the Hōshū Main Line was renamed the Nippō Main Line. With the privatization of Japanese National Railways (JNR), the successor of JGR, on 1 April 1987, the station came under the control of JR Kyushu.

Passenger statistics
In fiscal 2015, there were a total of 29,787 boarding passengers, giving a daily average of 82 passengers.

See also
List of railway stations in Japan

References

External links

  

Railway stations in Ōita Prefecture
Railway stations in Japan opened in 1911